A tidal stream can refer to two different phenomena:

tidal stream (marine science), currents associated with the tides
tidal stream (astrophysics), streams of stars and gas